The East Allen County Times was one of five community publications published by KPC Media Group, Inc. in Fort Wayne, Indiana. It was a freely circulated, monthly newspaper which was direct-mailed to zip codes 46774 in New Haven, 46741 in Grabill, 46743 in Harlan, 45745 in Hoagland, 46797 in Woodburn and 46773 in Monroeville with a circulation of over 13,000 addresses. It contained editorial pertaining to Eastern Allen County, Indiana.

Today, the five KPC Media Group print editions include The Aboite News, The Dupont Valley News, The New Haven News, The Leo-Cedarville News, and The Northwest News

References

KPC Media Group
Newspapers published in Fort Wayne, Indiana